Kulegu (Kaitag and Dargwa: Кьулегу) is a rural locality (a selo) in Dzhibakhninsky Selsoviet, Kaytagsky District, Republic of Dagestan, Russia. The population was 151 as of 2010. There are 4 streets.

Geography 
Kulegu is located 14km southeast of Madzhalis (the district's administrative centre) by road. Khatagi and Dzhinabi are the nearest rural localities.

Nationalities 
Dargins live there.

References 

Rural localities in Kaytagsky District